The Palace of Raio is a Baroque era residence in the urbanized area of the municipality of Braga, in the civil parish of São José de São Lázaro. It is an example of the late Baroque, early Rococo style of decoration by Portuguese architect André Soares, notable for his influence in the northern Baroque movement.

History

The construction of this ornate palace was ordered by João Duarte de Faria, a knight of the Order of Christ, who was a rich merchant.

The commission was given to André Soares in 1754–1755, an architect already famous in the Braga region for his artistic and engineering projects. Soares reformulate the style first introduced to Porto by Nasoni, basing his interpretations on French-German sketches, "one of the expressions more distinct and powerful of the European Rococo". His work is characterized by the monumental nature of its forms, and for his use of natural elements in the decorative sculptures that permeate the design including the shells, jars, wreaths and garlands. These elements show the influence of the Augsburg sketches, or the Frenchman Meissonier, among others. In the context of Portuguese art, André Soares was part of the end of the Baroque period, and beginning of the Rococo; his style used the structure of the Baroque, but the decorative style of the Rococo. André Soares had worked on the Sanctuary of Bom Jesus and the Church of Santa Maria Madalena da Falperra, and the Raio Palace is seen as an extension of the "feative character of Falperra".

In 1760, the staircase was painted.

A century later, the residence was acquired by Miguel José Raio, then Viscount of São Lázaro (in 1867), thus, over time, becoming known as the Palace of Raio.

The Escola Profissional de Recuperação do Património de Sintra (Professional School for Recuperation of Sintra Patrimony) intervened in 1993 to repair the doors and windows on this first floor. The group was responsible for repairing the wood frames, cleaning of the stone from damage caused by humidity, completing moulds, installation of artificial stoneworks, reinforcing the structure with cement and reintegration of many of the sculptures. Matos Sequeira, an archeologist, once referred to the facade as similar to a piece of furniture from the court of Louis XV.

Architecture
The building is located in the urban context of Braga, situated alongside the Hospital of São Marcos and the pavilion sheltering the Fountain of the Idol.

It is a singular block, in the Baroque-style, constructed during the reign of King John V. The palace is a two-storey buildings, consisting of several three-doors on the main floor, flanked by ornate framed windows, and the second-floor consisting of several windows and balconies. The roof is topped by a veranda of balusters, with ornate vegetal pinnacles.

Over the main portal, deeply indented, is a sumptuous balcony of balusters, flanked by two decorative sculptures. The lintel over this second-floor balcony is monolithic. Its cornice, which is exceptionally recessed, and crowned by a balustrade consisting of six flaming sculptures, while four blazing amphorae on its flanks over an Ionic pilasters frame.

The main floor is embellished by frames of carved granite, and the outline of the wrought iron balconies. Apart from the main entrance, are two lateral doorways (all of which are painted in complementary blue). While the facade is covered in azulejo tile (and installed in the 19th century), the whole building is built from fine-grained granite. On the landing, the azulejos were likely executed by Bartolomeu Antunes, owing to the different interpretations of the Rococo: one more traditional, from a workshop in Lisbon; and another, which predominates a northern agitation, from Braga.

This residence is considered one of the most important public works of André Soares, presenting a facade that is profusely decorated, where the general symmetry contrasts with the asymmetries introduced by the windows. This is particularly true of the central section, which is similar to the models utilized in the Church of Falperra and Municipal Council building of Braga: all which have similar traits. The window over the main doorway connects a curved pediment, which reminds the viewer of the Church of Santa Maria Madalena, although highly projected from the rest of the facade. As Vitor Serrão mentions in his critique, it is across "the sensual and powerful sense of deconstruction that the openings almost announce the art of one Gaudi", and the building "imposes a newness and display, within a sensual Rococo rhythm to the noble staircase like an inviting exotic figure."

In the interior, is the noble staircase, with three arches and sculpture of a Turk, comparable to the four statues in the esplanade of the Church of Bom Jesus, who Smith attributes to André Soares (even if they were executed by masons José and António de Sousa.

See also 
 List of Baroque residences

Notes

Sources
 
 
 
 
 
 
 
 
 

Houses completed in 1754
Buildings and structures in Braga
Palaces in Portugal
Baroque architecture in Portugal
1754 establishments in Portugal
Museums in Braga
Museums established in 2015